Bowen Byram (born June 13, 2001) is a Canadian professional ice hockey defenceman currently playing for the  Colorado Avalanche of the National Hockey League (NHL). He was selected fourth overall by the Avalanche in the 2019 NHL Entry Draft.

The son of NHL player Shawn Byram, Byram was coached by his father until the age of 12, at which point he began playing full time with the Lethbridge Golden Hawks of the Alberta Major Bantam Hockey League. After two seasons with them, the Vancouver Giants of the Western Hockey League (WHL) selected Byram third overall in the 2016 WHL Bantam Draft. Playing with the team from 2017 to 2020, Byram earned a number of junior ice hockey awards, including the CHL Top Draft Prospect Award and the Western Conference Rookie of the Year title. He also represented Canada at a number of international under-18 and junior tournaments, including gold medal finishes at the 2018 Hlinka Gretzky Cup and the 2020 World Junior Ice Hockey Championships.

After finishing in second place at the 2021 World Junior Championships, Byram joined the Avalanche for the  NHL season. His rookie year was marred by two concussions and a COVID-19 diagnosis, the latter of which exacerbated his concussion symptoms. After playing in only 19 regular season games, Byram was able to join the team for the 2021 Stanley Cup playoffs, but did not play. He scored his first NHL goal on the opening day of the  season, but was concussed again shortly thereafter. Byram won the Stanley Cup with the Avalanche in 2022.

Early life 
Byram was born on June 13, 2001, in Cranbrook, British Columbia, Canada, to Stacey and Shawn Byram. His father was a professional ice hockey player who followed his brief stint in the National Hockey League (NHL) with 11 seasons in minor and European leagues. Steve Byram served as his son's hockey coach until Byram was 12, at which point he joined the Lethbridge Golden Hawks of the Alberta Major Bantam Hockey League (AMBHL). Michael Dyck, the Lethbridge coach, first noticed Byram during a minor ice hockey game when he was 10 years old. He spent two seasons with Lethbridge, and during the 2015–16 AMBHL season, Byram was the top-scoring defenceman in the league, with 22 goals and 37 assists in 34 games. The Golden Hawks won the AMBHL championships and finished in third place at the Western Canadian Bantam AAA Championship.

Playing career

Junior 
Following his successful stint in the AMBHL, Byram was selected third overall by the Vancouver Giants of the Western Hockey League (WHL) at the 2016 WHL Bantam Draft, and he signed with the team shortly afterwards. As he still had a year of minor midget hockey availability, he was only eligible to appear in five WHL games during the 2016–17 season, but he ultimately appeared in 11 junior ice hockey games that season, splitting time between Vancouver, Yale Hockey Academy in Abbotsford, British Columbia, and the Lethbridge Hurricanes of the Alberta Midget Hockey League (AMHL). With Yale, Byram recorded 29 points in 20 regular season games, as well as four points in three postseason appearances.

Playing his first full season with the Giants in 2017–18, Byram scored his first WHL goal on October 21, 2017, as part of a 5–2 victory over the Regina Pats. By February, Byram was registering almost 23 minutes of ice time per game, and was considered not only a top prospect for the National Hockey League (NHL) but a future captain for the Giants. That month, he recorded three goals and six assists in a span of 12 games and was subsequently named the WHL Rookie of the Month. With six goals and 27 points in 60 regular season games, Byram outscored former Giants star Jonathon Blum, considered one of the top players on the team, who only recorded 24 points during his 16-year-old season. Although the Giants lost their opening-round playoff series to the Victoria Royals, Byram added three postseason goals and four assists to his season totals. At the end of the year, Byram was named the WHL Western Conference Rookie of the Year, and he was the runner-up to Dylan Cozens of the Lethbridge Hurricanes for the Jim Piggott Memorial Trophy.

On November 22, 2018, only 23 games into the 2018–19 season, scored his seventh goal of the season, surpassing his previous season totals. With nine goals and 25 points halfway through the season, Byram was selected to represent the Giants at the 2019 Sherwin-Williams Top Prospects Game. After a five-point game against the Kamloops Blazers on January 13, 2019, Byram, who set a franchise record for most single-game points by a defenceman, was named the WHL On the Run Player of the Week. That March, Byram scored his sixth overtime goal of the season to help defeat the Tri-City Americans 4–3, setting a WHL record for most overtime goals in one year in the process. With 26 goals and 45 assists in 67 regular season games, Byram set a Giants record for the most goals by any defenceman in a season and helped the team clinch the No. 1 seed in the WHL Western Conference playoffs. Although Vancouver lost to the Prince Albert Raiders in the final playoff round, Byram led all WHL skaters with 26 points (eight goals and 18 assists) in 22 postseason games, and he was the first Vancouver Giant to ever receive the CHL Top Draft Prospect Award. He was also named to the WHL Western Conference First All-Star Team. His performance with Vancouver that season led the NHL Central Scouting Bureau to rank Byram the second-best North American skater available in the upcoming 2019 NHL Entry Draft. Byram was the first defenceman taken in that year's draft, selected fourth overall by the Colorado Avalanche. He signed a three-year, entry-level contract with the team on July 19, 2019.

Byram was invited to join the Avalanche for their 2019 training camp, but was returned to the Giants for the 2019–20 season. He had a slow start with Vancouver that season, netting only three goals in 27 games before leaving the team to join Canada at the 2020 World Junior Ice Hockey Championships in December. His return from the World Juniors was followed by a surge in scoring, with seven goals and 17 assists through 12 games in the month of February, and Byram was named the WHL Player of the Month. By the time that the WHL season was prematurely suspended in March due to the COVID-19 pandemic, Byram had 14 goals, 52 points, and a +19 plus–minus through 50 games. He was named to the WHL Western Conference Second All-Star Team and finished his junior hockey career with 46 goals and 150 points in 188 regular season games, as well as 33 points in an additional 29 postseason games.

Professional
As he had participated abroad in the 2021 World Junior Ice Hockey Championships, Byram's NHL debut was delayed as he had to clear a seven-day quarantine and produce four negative COVID-19 tests before joining his teammates in Colorado. He made his NHL debut on January 21, 2021, playing for 11 minutes with one shot on goal and one minor penalty in a 4–2 loss to the Los Angeles Kings. His first NHL point came the following day, an assist on a Mikko Rantanen goal in the third period of a 2–1 win over the Anaheim Ducks. At the end of February, however, Byram's rookie season was put on hold when he woke up with concussion symptoms; he did not know what caused the concussion, but he began feeling ill the day after a game against the Arizona Coyotes. He returned on March 18 and played in four games, missing one with a lower-body injury, before taking a hit from Keegan Kolesar of the Vegas Golden Knights on March 25, and he was placed in concussion protocols three days later. While still in concussion protocols, Byram contracted COVID-19, which exacerbated his symptoms, particularly vertigo, and even after he was medically cleared to play, coach Jared Bednar chose not to put Byram on the line-up. He was finally added back into the Avalanche on May 26, in time for the second round of the 2021 Stanley Cup playoffs. Bednar was reluctant to allow Byram to take the ice, however, and he did not appear in any part of the Golden Knights' six-game victory over the Avalanche. He appeared in only 19 games as a rookie in the  season, with two assists and a +1 rating.

Byram scored his first NHL goal in the opening game of the  season, scoring on Marc-André Fleury of the Chicago Blackhawks en route to a 4–2 win on October 13, 2021. The following month, he sustained his third concussion of the 2021 calendar year after taking an elbow to the head from Vancouver Canucks captain Bo Horvat. He returned briefly for two games at the end of November before going back on the injured reserve. Byram only returned in full on January 1, following a league-wide pause due to COVID-19 outbreaks among several NHL teams. Less than two weeks later, Byram, who was still dealing with lingering concussion symptoms, took a personal leave from the Avalanche. On March 31, the Avalanche sent Byram to the Colorado Eagles, their American Hockey League (AHL) affiliate, for conditioning. After his time with the Eagles, Byram returned to the Avalanche and played eleven games to close out the regular season, working with a rotation of partners designed to ease him back in and prepare for the postseason. The Avalanche faced the Nashville Predators in the opening round of the 2022 Stanley Cup playoffs, prevailing in four games, before facing the St. Louis Blues in the second round. Byram's role on the team increased after Sam Girard was injured midway through the series against the Blues. The Avalanche advanced to the Western Conference Final for the first time in twenty years, beating the Edmonton Oilers in another sweep to qualify for the 2022 Stanley Cup Finals. There, the Avalanche defeated the Tampa Bay Lightning in six games to become Stanley Cup champions. On the way to their championship title, Byram contributed nine assists in 20 postseason games.

International play

 

Byram first represented Canada internationally at the 2017 World U-17 Hockey Challenge, where he scored one goal and four assists in six games with the Canada Red team, which ultimately came in second place to the undefeated United States team. After the tournament, Byram was one of five players named to that year's All-Star team. The following year, he was one of three players born in 2001 to join Canada for the 2018 IIHF World U18 Championships in Russia. After recording only one assist in Canada's fifth-place finish, Byram received his first gold medal with one goal and three assists in five games of the 2018 Hlinka Gretzky Cup.

Following his performance in these under-18 tournaments, Byram was named to the Canadian junior team for the 2020 World Junior Ice Hockey Championships. where he recorded two assists in seven games and took home another gold medal. The following year, he was initially named an alternate captain for the 2021 World Junior Championship, but a wrist injury to captain Kirby Dach promoted Byram and Dylan Cozens to the role. With one goal and five points in seven games, Byram helped Canada to capture second place and was named to the Media All-Star team.

Personal life
Byram and his father are avid outdoorsmen and recreational hunters. Outside of hockey, he also enjoys watching baseball and basketball.

Career statistics

Regular season and playoffs

International

Awards and honours

References

External links
 

2001 births
Living people
Canadian ice hockey defencemen
Colorado Avalanche draft picks
Colorado Avalanche players
Colorado Eagles players
Ice hockey people from British Columbia
National Hockey League first-round draft picks
Sportspeople from Cranbrook, British Columbia
Stanley Cup champions
Vancouver Giants players